Roosta or Rustah (in Persian: روستا) was the name of a district in Isfahan area in Iran attested in historical sources. The Persian explorer Ibn Rustah was a native of Roosta.

Former districts of Iran
Geography of Isfahan Province